Seid Lizde (born 8 July 1995 in Catania) is an Italian-born Bosnian cyclist, who last rode for UCI Continental team .

Major results

2013
 1st  Time trial, Italian National Junior Road Championships
2014
 2nd Time trial, Italian National Under-23 Road Championships
 2nd GP Bianco di Custoza
 7th Time trial, UEC European Under-23 Road Championships
2015
 2nd Ruota d'Oro
 2nd GP Laguna
 4th Time trial, Italian National Under-23 Road Championships
2016
 2nd Gran Premio Industrie del Marmo
 3rd Time trial, Italian National Under-23 Road Championships
 4th Gran Premio della Liberazione
 6th Giro del Belvedere
2017
 1st Gran Premio della Liberazione
 2nd Trofeo Banca Popolare di Vicenza
2018
 5th Overall Tour of China II
1st Stage 3

References

External links

1995 births
Living people
Italian male cyclists
Bosnia and Herzegovina male cyclists
Sportspeople from Catania
Cyclists from Sicily